Courage is the ability to confront fear in the face of pain, danger, uncertainty or intimidation.

Courage may also refer to:

Ethics 
 Civil courage, a core issue in ethics
 Moral courage, an important virtue in various areas of life

Arts and entertainment

Film and television
 Courage (1921 film), an American silent drama film
 Courage (1930 film), an American drama film
 Courage (1939 film), a Soviet adventure film
 Courage, or Raw Courage, a 1984 film starring Ronny Cox
 Courage, a 1986 television film starring Sophia Loren
 Courage (2011 film), a Polish film
 Courage (2021 film), a German-Belarusian documentary film
 Courage (Courage the Cowardly Dog), the title character of the animated TV series Courage the Cowardly Dog
 "Courage" (X-Men), a television episode

Literature and periodicals
 Courage (newspaper), a German feminist newspaper 1976–1984
 Courage: Eight Portraits, a 2007 book by Gordon Brown
 Courage: The Backbone of Leadership, a 2006 book by Gus Lee and Diane Elliott-Lee

Music
 The Courage, an American folk rock band

Albums
 Courage (Celine Dion album) or the title song (see below), 2019
 Courage (Fish Leong album) or the title song, 2000
 Courage (Frankie J album) or the title song, 2011
 Courage (Milton Nascimento album) or the title song, 1969
 Courage (Paula Cole album), 2007
 Courage (EP), by the Bats, or the title song, 1993

Songs
 "Courage" (Celine Dion song), 2019
 "Courage (for Hugh MacLennan)", by the Tragically Hip, 1993
 "Courage", by the Bats from Silverbeet, 1993
 "Courage", by Alien Ant Farm from Anthology, 2001
 "Courage", by Flatfoot 56 from Black Thorn, 2010
 "Courage", by Orianthi from Believe (II), 2010
 "Courage", by Pink from Hurts 2B Human, 2019
 "Courage", by Superchick from Beauty from Pain, 2005
 "Courage", by Villagers from Darling Arithmetic, 2015
 "Courage", by the Whitest Boy Alive from Rules, 2009

Organizations and companies 
 Courage Brewery, a defunct British brewery
 Courage Compétition, a motor racing team and company based at Le Mans
 Courage Foundation, a fundraising trust for the legal defence of whistleblowers and journalists
 Courage International, a Roman Catholic organization
 Courage Investment Group, a Bermuda-registered shipping company
 Courage UK (originally Courage Trust), a nonprofit evangelical Christian organisation
 Courage, the mascot and the motto of  the Second Cavalry Regiment, an Australian Army Armoured Reconnaissance Regiment

People with the surname
 Alexander Courage (1919–2008), American composer
 Anthony Courage (1875 – 1944), one of the British First World War cavalry generals
 James Courage (1903–1963), New Zealand novelist
 Piers Courage (1942–1970), British race car driver